The Act to confronting the hostile actions of the Zionist regime against peace and security is a plan that was passed on May 20, 2020 by the Islamic Consultative Assembly (Parliament of the Islamic Republic of Iran) in accordance to the Article 123 of the Constitution of the Islamic Republic of Iran. The Act is a comprehensive plan including 16 articles to counter the hostile actions of the Zionist regime against the people of Palestine, Islamic countries and the Islamic Republic of Iran. The Act refers to the destructive role of the illegitimate regime of Zionist in disrupting regional and international peace and security and widespread and systematic violation of the human rights.

Approval details 
The Act to confronting the hostile actions of the Zionist regime against peace and security was presented in the form of a plan in the public meeting of the parliament of Iran on Monday May 18, 2020. It was a two-emergency plan, meaning representatives had 24 hours to consider its details. After the approval of the plan by the parliament with the favor vote of all representatives, the Guardian Council confirmed it on the Wednesday, May 20, 2020. The Guardian Council also informed the Act to the President for official implementation. Finally on the Tuesday, May 26, 2020, the Act was announced by the President Hassan Rouhani in letter No. 21448 for implementation to the Ministry of Interior, the Ministry of Intelligence, the Ministry of Foreign Affairs, the Ministry of Defence and Armed Forces Logistics, the Supreme National Security Council and the Judicial system of the Islamic Republic of Iran.

Content 
The Act to confronting the hostile actions of the Zionist regime against peace and security has 16 articles and 1 amendment as follows:

 Article 1

According to the Act, all executive bodies of the country (Iran), within the framework of the general policies of the system and benefiting from regional and international capacities, are obliged to confront with the hostile actions of the Zionist regime against the oppressed people of Palestine, Islamic countries and the Islamic Republic of Iran and the destructive role of this illegitimate regime in disrupting regional and international peace and security and its widespread and systematic violations of human rights, including incitement to war, terrorist acts, electronic warfare, the use of heavy weapons and prohibited weapons against civilians, humanitarian siege, illegal town constraction, displacing the Palestinian people, trying to annex other parts of the Palestinian territory illegally, continuing the occupation of the Palestinian territory and some parts of Syria (Golan), Lebanon and other occupied territories.

 Article 2

Pursuant to the Note to Article (1) of the "Protection of the Islamic Revolution of the Palestinian People Act", approved on May 9, 1990, with its subsequent amendments and additions, the Ministry of Foreign Affairs is obliged to make the necessary preparations for the establishment of a "virtual embassy or consulate of the Islamic Republic of Iran" within six months and submit the result to the Cabinet for approval. The Ministry of Foreign Affairs is obliged to take the necessary measures in consultation with other countries.

 Article 3

Pursuant to Article (5) of "The Act to Obliging the Government to Provide Comprehensive Support to the Oppressed Palestinian People", approved on December 31, 2008, and Article (8) of the "Protection of the Islamic Revolution of the Palestinian People Act", the list of organizations, non-governmental organizations, economic and commercial, financial, scientific, cultural and research institutions, natural and juridical persons and the like subject to the mentioned articles, will be identified and updated annually by a committee consisting of the Ministry of Industry, Mine and Trade, the Ministry of Intelligence, the Ministry of Economic Affairs and Finance, the Central Bank, the Intelligence Organization of the Islamic Revolutionary Guard Corps, the Quds Force and the Ministry of Foreign Affairs. The Ministry of Foreign Affairs will be in charge of organizing and secretaryship of the meetings of the committee, and the Ministry is obliged to submit an annual report on the performance of the committee to the National-Security and Foreign-Policy Commission of the Islamic Consultative Assembly.

 Article 4

Issuance of any license for direct or indirect participation of natural or juridical persons, including companies, organizations, institutions or non-governmental organizations affiliated with the Zionist regime in all exhibitions or any domestic or international conference, or participation or assistance in its issuance, is prohibited, and the perpetrator will be sentenced to fifth degree imprisonment and permanent deprivation of the public and government service tenure.

 Article 5

Any use of the hardware produced by the Zionist regime in Iran and the activity of software platforms belonging to this regime in the country is prohibited. Also, any provision of services by Iranian companies to these platforms is prohibited. A person who is incompetent or guilty or refuses to comply with this article will be sentenced to fifth degree imprisonment and five years deprivation of public and government services. The Supreme Council of Cyberspace, in cooperation with the Ministry of Intelligence and the Ministry of Information and Communications Technology, is obliged to identify these hardware and platforms and inform the Prosecutor-General to enforce the law.

 Article 6

Any intelligence cooperation or espionage in favor of the Zionist regime is equal to belligerence and sabotage and the perpetrator will be sentenced to the most severe punishment.

 Article 7

Any cooperation, interaction, political agreement or exchange of information with official and unofficial institutions and individuals affiliated with the Zionist regime is prohibited, the perpetrator will be sentenced to fourth degree imprisonment and permanent dismissal from government service tenure.

 Article 8

Any action such as security, military, political, cultural, media, propaganda, direct and indirect economic and financial consciously assistance in order to approve or strengthen the Zionist regime is prohibited. The perpetrator will be sentenced to fifth degree imprisonment.

 Article 9

The entry and passage of any goods of companies affiliated with the Zionist regime from the territory of the Islamic Republic of Iran is prohibited and also the entry of all Zionists subject to the Zionist regime, including natural or juridical persons who are citizens of the Zionist regime, is prohibited. They will be sentenced to fifth degree imprisonment and deportation if they enter.

 Article 10

Iranian citizens are not allowed to travel to occupied Palestine. The perpetrator will be sentenced to fifth degree imprisonment and deprivation of the passport for two to five years. Non-accidental communication between Iranian citizens and citizens of the occupying Zionist regime is also prohibited and the perpetrator will be sentenced to sixth degree imprisonment.

 Article 11

The Prosecutor-General, in cooperation with the Ministry of Foreign Affairs and the Office of the Presidential Legal Services, is obliged to use the capacities of domestic, foreign and international authorities and institutions to support the Palestinian people and other victims in filing lawsuits, trials and executions to punish the criminal leaders of the occupying Zionist regime for crimes against humanity, war crimes, genocide, rape and terrorist acts inside and outside the occupied territories, in competent domestic and foreign courts, and in international tribunals such as International Court of Justice.

The executive bodies subject to Article (29) of the "Sixth Five-Year Plan for Economic, Social and Cultural Development of the Islamic Republic of Iran Act", approved on March 4, 2017, including the Ministry of Foreign Affairs, the Ministry of Justice, the Ministry of Intelligence, the Intelligence Organization of the IRGC and the IRGC are obliged to prepare complaints and cooperate with the competent agencies.

 Article 12

The Ministry of Foreign Affairs is obliged to follow up on the realization of the political plan of the Islamic Republic of Iran for Palestine entitled "Holding a national referendum in the Palestine territories" which has been registered with the United Nations under number "s/2019062" in political and diplomatic fields and submit an annual report to the National-Security and Foreign-Policy Commission of the Islamic Consultative Assembly.

 Article 13

The Iranian government is obliged to support the activities of other governments, nations and domestic and international non-governmental organizations which advocate the liberation of Jerusalem and condemnation, restriction and sanction of the occupying Zionist regime. The government is obliged to take the necessary measures to counter any attempt to normalize relations with the Zionist regime and its presence in the region and in the Islamic world. Also the government should explain the issue of "Zionism worse than apartheid" in international organizations and forums.

 Article 14

Pursuant to Article (6) of the "Protection of the Islamic Revolution of the Palestinian People Act", all cultural institutions of the country, including the Ministry of Culture and Islamic Guidance, the Islamic Republic of Iran Broadcasting, the Islamic Culture and Communication Organization and the Islamic Development Organization are obliged to use all their capabilities and capacities to produce cultural products in order to explain the nature of Zionism, expose the crimes of Zionism against humanity and reveal the illegal occupation of Jerusalem by Zionism. The Ministry of Culture and Islamic Guidance is obliged to provide special support for the production of medias and films with the mentioned content.

 Article 15

The financial burden resulting from the implementation of the provisions of the Act shall be provided from the savings of the agencies subject to the Act.

 Article 16

In order to follow up and coordinate the implementation of the Act, a special committee consisting of representatives of the Secretariat of the Supreme National Security Council, the Ministry of Foreign Affairs, the Ministry of Intelligence (Foreign Intelligence Agency and Deputy of Counterintelligence), the Intelligence Organization of the IRGC, the Quds Force, the Prosecutor-General, the Ministry of Interior, the Ministry of Defence and Armed Forces Logistics and the Secretariat of the International Conference on Supporting Palestine Intifada of the Islamic Consultative Assembly will be formed. The committee is obliged to submit a report on the performance of the agencies mentioned in the Act to the National-Security and Foreign-Policy Commission of the Islamic Consultative Assembly. The Secretariat of the Supreme National Security Council will be in charge of organizing and secretaryship of the meetings of the committee.

See also 
 Law on confrontation with human-rights violations and USA adventuresome and terrorist measures in the region
 Iranian Government's Reciprocal and Proportional Action in Implementing the JCPOA Act
 Specialized Commissions of the Parliament of Iran

Notes 
1.An amendment to The Act to confronting the hostile actions of the Zionist regime against peace and security was announced by President Hassan Rouhani on Tuesday, July 7, 2020: In the Article 12, the UN registration number for the plan to hold a national referendum in the Palestine region will be amended from "s/2019062" to "s/2019/862".

References

External links 
 Rouhani declares law on countering Israel’s hostile actions
 Iranian Parliament Approves Bill to Confront Israel’s Hostile Measures against Peace and Security
 Law on Confronting Hostile Acts of Zionists against Peace & Security
 President Rouhani signs law to counter hostile moves of Zionist regime

Law of Iran
Government of Iran
Presidency of Hassan Rouhani
Modern history of Iran
Anti-Zionism
Israel and apartheid